The Battle of Dawan Cheng of 1934 occurred when Gen. Ma Zhongying's Chinese Muslim New 36th Division encountered a Soviet Russian Army armoured car column. The New 36th Division was withdrawing, chased by White Russian and  Mongol troops and Chinese forces allied with them.  The New 36th Division wiped out nearly the entire column, after engaging the Russians in fierce, sometimes hand-to-hand combat, and knocked the wrecked Russian armored cars down the mountain. When a White Russian force showed up, Ma Zhongying withdrew.

References 

Conflicts in 1934
1934 in China
1934 in the Soviet Union
China–Soviet Union relations
Wars involving the Soviet Union
Military history of the Soviet Union
Military history of the Republic of China (1912–1949)
Xinjiang Wars
Battles involving the Soviet Union